Mauro Andrés Caballero Aguilera (born 27 September 1994) is a Paraguayan professional footballer who plays as a striker for Portuguese club Académica de Coimbra. He is the son of Mauro Caballero Senior who played for the club Torpedo Kutaisi .

Career
Caballero played for Libertad U20 at the 2011 U-20 Copa Libertadores, where he scored 3 goals during the competition, including a double against Universitario de Deportes U20 and one goal against Boca Juniors U20.

On 31 August 2021, he moved to Académica de Coimbra.

Honours

Olimpia
 Paraguayan Primera División: 2012 Clausura

FC Vaduz
 Liechtenstein Cup: 2015–16

Torpedo Kutaisi
 Georgian Cup: 2022

Paraguay U-15
 South American Under-15 Football Championship: 2009

References

External links
 
 

1994 births
Sportspeople from Asunción
Living people
Paraguayan footballers
Paraguay international footballers
Association football forwards
Club Libertad footballers
FC Porto B players
F.C. Penafiel players
C.D. Aves players
FC Vaduz players
Club Olimpia footballers
Club Deportivo Palestino footballers
San Luis de Quillota footballers
Unión Española footballers
F.C. Arouca players
Associação Académica de Coimbra – O.A.F. players
Paraguayan Primera División players
Liga Portugal 2 players
Swiss Super League players
Chilean Primera División players
Primeira Liga players
Paraguayan expatriate footballers
Expatriate footballers in Portugal
Paraguayan expatriate sportspeople in Portugal
Expatriate footballers in Liechtenstein
Paraguayan expatriate sportspeople in Liechtenstein
Expatriate footballers in Chile
Paraguayan expatriate sportspeople in Chile